Hipponix climax is a species of small limpet-like sea snail, a marine gastropod mollusk in the family Hipponicidae, the hoof snails.

Distribution

Description 
The maximum recorded shell length is 11 mm.

Habitat 
Minimum recorded depth is 240 m. Maximum recorded depth is 260 m.

References

External links

Hipponicidae
Gastropods described in 2005